Channel NSW (also known as CNSW) was a community information digital television channel that ran under trial in the Sydney area. The service was provided and operated by the Government of New South Wales. It was carried via Digital 44 using the Digital Video Broadcasting – Terrestrial (DVB-T) system had its own channel on Channel 45.

CNSW had gained a large audience, with a reach of over 250,000 households per month in Sydney. This was forecast to grow to over 1 million households by 2009.

The NSW Government had plans for NSW settlements of 2,000 people or more to receive the service terrestrially. The channel ceased transmissions at midnight on 30 April 2010.

Content
Channel NSW included these programs:
 ecoNSW – environment
 PictureJockey (PJs) – photos
 Good Health NSW Health
 PeakHour – traffic, weather, and related info
 Seniors TV
 School Kid TV
 NSW Life – lifestyle
 Allballs – lottery results
 Arts Magazine
 Late Night Languages
 Careers Show
 uTVstar – community access
 Parliament of New South Wales – live parliament feed
 Job Show – NSW Government jobs

NSW Government agencies which provided services through CNSW include the:
 Roads & Traffic Authority
 NSW Health
 Department of Education & Training
 State Emergency Service, Rural Fire and Fire Brigades
 Office of Industrial Relations, NSW Government Jobs Service
 NSW Lotteries
 Sydney Harbour Foreshore Authority, The Rocks, Tourism NSW
 Art Gallery of NSW, State Records, Powerhouse Museum
 Department of Environment and Conservation
 Sydney Water

History
Key milestones in the development of the service to date are as follows:
 Commonwealth grants NSW trial license (December 2003);
 Initial service launched by the Minister for Commerce (March 2004);
 Remote playout operations capability enabled (July 2004);
 Initial audiovisual capability tested (August 2004);
 Block scheduling capability (February 2005);
 First field audience research (October 2005); and
 Interactive TV services lab testing (MHP) (March 2006).

Future
Channel NSW was running as a trial and is a work in progress. The NSW government had future plans for the channel which included:
 Live event coverage, such as Parliament question time;
 Automated whole-of-government announcements service; and
 "Resource Show", a hybrid media program about the environment.

Digital terrestrial television in Australia
Legislature broadcasters in Australia
Government of New South Wales
Defunct television channels in Australia
2004 establishments in Australia
2010 disestablishments in Australia
Television channels and stations established in 2004
Television channels and stations disestablished in 2010
Digital Forty Four